Février is a French surname meaning February.

Notable people with this surname include:
 Audrey Février (born 1990), French football player
 Henry Février (1875–1957), French composer
 Jacques Février (1900–1979), French pianist
 James Germain Février (1895–1976), French historian
 Jules Février (1842–1937), French architect
 Pierre Février (1696–1760), French composer
 Stuart Charles-Fevrier (born 1959), Saint Lucian football manager